Yaminovo is a rural locality (a village) in Spasskoye Rural Settlement, Vologodsky District, Vologda Oblast, Russia. The population was 4 as of 2002. There are 3 streets.

Geography 
Yaminovo is located 17 km southwest of Vologda (the district's administrative centre) by road. Shelygino is the nearest rural locality.

References 

Rural localities in Vologodsky District